Sundance Airport  is a public use airport located at 13000 N. Sara Road in the city of Yukon in Canadian County, Oklahoma, United States. The airport is 11 nautical miles (20 km) northwest of the central business district of Oklahoma City. It is privately owned by Hunter Group LLC.

Facilities and aircraft 
It has one runway designated 18/36 with a concrete surface measuring 5,001 by 100 feet (1,524 x 30 m). The airport offers self-service 100LL and full service 100LL and Jet A.

For the 12-month period ending November 21, 2016, the airport had 39,492 general aviation aircraft operations, an average of 108 per day. There are 209 aircraft based at this airport: 81% single-engine, 15% multi-engine and 4% jet.

References

External links 
  Sundance Airport, official site
 Aerial photo as of 26 March 2002 from USGS The National Map via MSR Maps
 
 

Airports in Oklahoma
Buildings and structures in Canadian County, Oklahoma
Transportation in Oklahoma City